Arthur Fraser Mann (23 January 1948 – 4 February 1999) was a Scottish professional footballer, who played as a defender. He later moved into management and coaching.

Biography

Mann was born in Burntisland, Scotland and began his playing career at Heart of Midlothian. He played for Hearts in the 1968 Scottish Cup Final, although he ended up on the losing side as Dunfermline won 3–1. He then moved to England, where he represented Manchester City. He was signed by Joe Mercer and Malcolm Allison for a then club record of £65,000. In common with Dennis Bergkamp, he had a fear of flying and so was unable to take part in City's European escapades. He failed to break into the Cup winning side and moved on after a season to Blackpool. He then moved to Notts County, Shrewsbury Town, Mansfield Town, Boston United (whom he also managed), Kettering Town and Telford United. He was Alan Buckley's assistant manager at Grimsby Town and West Bromwich Albion, and had a spell as caretaker-manager at Albion early in 1997 following Buckley's dismissal. He is the father of former Hull City stalwart Neil Mann. Mann died on 4 February 1999 in an industrial accident at a Birmingham factory.

References

Sources
 Arthur Mann
 

1948 births
1999 deaths
Footballers from Falkirk
Scottish footballers
Scottish football managers
Association football fullbacks
Heart of Midlothian F.C. players
Manchester City F.C. players
Blackpool F.C. players
Notts County F.C. players
Shrewsbury Town F.C. players
Mansfield Town F.C. players
Boston United F.C. players
Boston United F.C. managers
Kettering Town F.C. players
Telford United F.C. players
West Bromwich Albion F.C. managers
Industrial accident deaths
Accidental deaths in England
Grimsby Town F.C. non-playing staff